Bermuda competed at the 1972 Summer Olympics in Munich, West Germany.

Boxing

Men

Rowing

Men

Sailing

Open

References
Official Olympic Reports

Nations at the 1972 Summer Olympics
1972 Summer Olympics
1972 in Bermudian sport